Bernard F. Baran Jr. (May 25, 1965 – September 1, 2014) was an American day care employee wrongfully convicted in the day care sex abuse hysteria of the 1980s and 1990s that was spawned by the McMartin preschool trial.

Unlike other day care cases, the Baran case garnered little national press coverage. The Baran case spanned almost 25 years from his arrest in October 1984 until all charges were dropped in June 2009. Baran maintained his innocence throughout his case, making him ineligible for parole. Baran was accused, tried and convicted within a three-month period and sentenced to three life sentences in January 1985. In 2009, the Massachusetts Appeals Court vacated the convictions, deeming the case "notorious," and citing the behavior of the original prosecutor as "troubling." The Baran case is the subject of the 2010 documentary film Freeing Bernie Baran.

Background
Bernard Baran took a job as a teacher's aide in 1983 at the Early Childhood Development Center (ECDC) in his hometown of Pittsfield, the county seat of Berkshire County in Western Massachusetts. Shortly before his employment, social workers placed a four-year-old boy at ECDC due to the child's home environment. Eventually, the child ended up in the classroom where Baran worked. In September 1984, accusations of sexual abuse at the Fells Acres Day School in Malden, Massachusetts, made news across the state and beyond. Shortly thereafter, the parents of the boy complained to the board of directors of ECDC that they "didn't want no homo" working with their child. The Board of Directors held a meeting on September 12, 1984, to specifically discuss Baran's homosexuality, and the possibility of terminating his employment because of it. Baran retained his job after being questioned about his homosexuality by his superiors.

First allegation
On October 1, 1984, the parents of the boy in question removed him from ECDC in protest of Baran's continued employment. The parents were drug addicts and police informants. On October 5, 1984, they called their connection at the Pittsfield police department drug control unit. They alleged that Bernard Baran molested their son at ECDC that day, three days after they had removed the child from the day care. The following day the police began an investigation at ECDC and validated this claim of sexual abuse.

Hysteria
Word of the first allegation broke shortly after the investigation began. Within days the day care center had sponsored a puppet show to facilitate other children's ability to talk about abuse. The day care also notified all the parents that a child at the day care had gonorrhea. After multiple children were interviewed with anatomically correct dolls at both of ECDC's locations, one where Baran worked and one where he did not, Baran was indicted on 3 counts of rape and 5 counts of indecent assault on November 5, 1984.

Trial
Baran's case went from arrest to trial in 105 days, convening in court on January 23, 1985, receiving significant local media attention. The court room was closed to the public and the press during the children's testimony without any hearing into the necessity for closing the court, which Baran claimed violated his 6th Amendment right to a public trial. Baran was positioned in the court room so that he could not even hear the testimony of the children. On January 30, 1985, he received three life sentences for three counts of rape of a child and five counts of indecent assault and battery. His conviction held up on appeal in 1986. The law firm that handled his appeal eventually destroyed his defense case file.

Motion for new trial
In 1999 a new legal team took Baran's case. In a series of hearings from 1999 to 2005, the original defense file was recreated from the contents of the civil suits filed against ECDC after the Baran conviction. The motion for a new trial contained over 300 flawed items in the original trial, including prosecutorial misconduct, ineffective assistance of counsel, and the use of suggestive interviewing techniques with the children. The motion rested in June 2005.

Release and freedom
Baran was granted a new trial in 2006. The Berkshire County District Attorney's office appealed the granting of a new trial in 2008. In 2009 the Massachusetts Appeals Court affirmed the 2006 ruling and set aside the 1984 convictions.

In 2010, Baran's lawyers began the process of suing multiple parties in civil court on his behalf. Even though a $400,000.00 settlement was reached in 2010 the state has denied liability and thus has yet to expunge his record.

Death
Baran died suddenly on September 1, 2014, at his home in Fitchburg, Massachusetts.

See also
 List of wrongful convictions in the United States

References

Bibliography
 Commonwealth versus Bernard F. Baran, Jr. Massachusetts Appeals Court Docket 07-P-1096. 2009-05-15.
 Superior Court Criminal Action No. 18042-51. The Commonwealth of Massachusetts versus Bernard F. Baran, Jr. Memorandum of Decision and Order on Defendant's Motion For A New Trial. 2006-06-21.
 Pollitt, Katha. Justice for Bernard Baran, The Nation, 2000-02-03.

External links
 Memorandum of Decision and Order on the Defendant's Motion to Dismiss
 The Bernard Baran Justice Committee
 The Boston Phoenix: "The Trials of Bernard Baran"
 Bernie Baran, of  Pittsfield, MA from witch hunt information center

Day care sexual abuse allegations in the United States
Overturned convictions in the United States
1965 births
American gay men
LGBT people from Massachusetts
Place of birth missing
2014 deaths
Daycare workers
Satanic ritual abuse hysteria in the United States
False allegations of sex crimes